Suicide is a significant social issue in Afghanistan.

It is estimated than 80 percent of suicide attempts in Afghanistan are made by women. The causes of this include mental health problems, domestic violence, forced marriages, and abuse.

Suicide is stigmatized in Islam, the official and majority religion in Afghanistan. 

According to the Afghan Independent Human Rights Commission, many suicides in Afghanistan are not reported.

See also 
 Health in Afghanistan

References

Further reading 
 
 

Afghanistan
Death in Afghanistan